Frenchman's Cove Provincial Park, is a provincial park located on the west side of the Burin Peninsula in Newfoundland and Labrador, Canada.

See also
List of Newfoundland and Labrador parks
List of Canadian provincial parks

External links
Frenchman's Cove Provincial Park, Newfoundland Provincial Parks website

Provincial parks of Newfoundland and Labrador